P. K. Venukuttan Nair (1931 – 26 November 2012) was an Indian theatre personality and Malayalam film actor. He was the vice-president of the Kerala Sangeetha Nataka Akademi and member of the Kendra Sangeet Natak Academy. He received the Kerala Sangeetha Nataka Akademi Award in 1995 and the Kerala Sangeetha Nataka Akademi Fellowship in 1998. He won many awards at state-level competitions for professional theatre, including the P. J. Antony Award in March 2002.

Nair died on 26 November 2012 following a brief illness in Thiruvananthapuram at the age of 81.

Filmography
 Swayamvaram (One's Own Choice, 1972)
 Mazhakkaaru (1973)
 Oolkatal (Bay, 1978) as Reena's father
 Swapnadanam (Journey Through a Dream, 1976) as Sumitra's father
 Ammaayi Amma (1977)
 Poojakkedukkaatha Pookkal (1977) as P. N. Pilla
 Kodiyettam (1978)
 Ulkadal (1979)
 Simhaasanam (1979)
 Kannukal (1979) .... Keshavan Nair
 Daaliyappookkal (1980)
 Poochasanyaasi (1981)
 Aambalppoovu (1981)
 Gaanam (1982)
 Oru Cheru Punchiri (A Slender Smile, 2000) as Govindettan

References 

1931 births
2012 deaths
20th-century Indian male actors
Indian male stage actors
Male actors from Thiruvananthapuram
Male actors in Malayalam cinema
Indian male film actors
Recipients of the Kerala Sangeetha Nataka Akademi Fellowship
Recipients of the Kerala Sangeetha Nataka Akademi Award